The Revolutionary Front was a far-left extremist political and militant network in Sweden. The goal of the RF was to dismantle the current society through a revolution and create a socialist state. The group fought against fascism, racism, sexism and capitalism, and campaigned through violent means.

Organization and activities
The Revolutionary Front was formed in 2002 by Joel Bjurströmer Almgren and others. It was formed after the Gothenburg riots in 2001 and had connections to the Swedish AFA but was different in that it was a strict organization and not a network. The organisation's strategy and tactics were inspired by the British Anti-Fascist Action movement. In 2014 Almgren was sentenced to five years in prison for stabbing a neo-Nazi in the back during the violent December 2013 Stockholm riots. In September 2015 the organisation dissolved.

References

2002 establishments in Sweden
2015 disestablishments in Sweden
Anti-fascism in Sweden
Anti-fascist organizations
Anti-racist organizations in Europe
Autonomism
Defunct organizations based in Sweden
Defunct political organizations
Far-left politics in Sweden
Left-wing militant groups
Organizations disestablished in 2015
Organizations established in 2002
Political organizations based in Sweden
Revolutionary organizations
Socialism in Sweden
Socialist organizations in Europe